The EBW group was a rail industry company consisting of several individual companies. It was declared insolvent in January 2010.

Group
The group's primary business was rail infrastructure and maintenance. The company also specialised in rail safety aspects of infrastructural work, specifically in terms of non-railway based workers performing construction tasks near or on main lines.

EBW Eisenbahn-bewachungs GmbH

EBW Eisenbahn-bewachungs was the main branch of the company, undertaking both financing and the rail freight operations of the group.

The freight operating company known as EBW cargo was headquartered in Würzburg, and focused on infrastructure trains, as well as leasing EBW owned locomotives and rolling stock (wagons), and organising and managing rail head fed site logistics.

IFE
IFE (Ingenieursleistungen für Eisenbahnen GmbH translation :"Engineering services for railways limited") was an
engineering firm - specialising in railway construction including catenary.

IAS
IAS GmbH was a maintenance company, providing services such as trackside vegetation management as well as landscape gardening.

VE-log
VE-log GmbH employsd approximately 60 people in the areas of land management, bulk materials and transportation, including recycling. Road transportation logistics is also performed by this company.

Rolling stock

Locomotives

EBW operated a number of rebuilt, former Deutsche Bahn locomotives.
 The three V270 class are rebuilt DB Class 221 locomotives. The locomotives are each either two Deutz TBD 620 V12 engines or two  MTU 12V 4000 engines R 41 R both of ~ each. Total  ~.
 Two V232/V230 (former DR Class 130 family locomotives) of ~  power, used for transportation of track laying machines as well as ballast and sleepers for railway track construction.
 3 DB Class V 60's (company name V60) for shunting work.

Wagons
The company holds and operates its own wagons - typically those designed for construction solids (with a typical capacity of ~40m3); designs suitable for moisture sensitive solids, conveyor belt and other controlled discharge methods are kept.

See also
 List of German railway companies

External links
 EBW-online Company website
 EBW-Cargo locomotives and shunters images from railfaneurope.net
 EBW Cargo Fotos image gallery from bahnbilder.de
 InnoTrans 2004 - OMB/EBW Cargo: V200.1-Modernisierung Modernisation of ex Greek railways V200.1 for EVB. railfan.de

References

Private railway companies of Germany
Railway infrastructure companies